The 1985 Embassy World Indoor Bowls Championship  was held at the Coatbridge indoor bowling club, North Lanarkshire, Scotland, 5–10 February 1985.

Terry Sullivan won the title beating Cecil Bransky in the final 21–18.

Draw and results

Men's singles

References

External links
Official website

World Indoor Bowls Championship
1985 in bowls